Brittain Gottlieb (born January 14, 2003) is an American professional soccer player who plays as a defender for FIU Panthers.

Club career
Born in Georgia, Gottlieb played soccer for his school, Islands High School.

South Georgia Tormenta
On March 25, 2021, Gottlieb joined USL League One club South Georgia Tormenta on an amateur deal. He made his professional debut for the club on April 17, 2021, against Fort Lauderdale CF, coming on as an 85th-minute substitute in a 1–0 defeat.

College
In fall of 2022, Gottlieb left South Georgia to play college soccer at Florida International University.

Career statistics

References

External links
 Profile at Tormenta

2003 births
Living people
American soccer players
Association football defenders
Tormenta FC players
Tormenta FC 2 players
USL League One players
USL League Two players
People from Chatham County, Georgia
Sportspeople from Savannah, Georgia
FIU Panthers men's soccer players